The Northern California PGA Championship is a golf tournament that is the championship of the Northern California section of the PGA of America.  Mark Fry, long-time pro at Sequoyah Country Club in Oakland, California, holds the record for most victories with 10. Tony Lema, British Open winner in 1964 and 12-time PGA Tour winner, won three consecutive Northern California PGA championships from 1962–64. Other PGA Tour winners who were also victorious in the Northern California PGA Championship include Bob Lunn (six-time PGA tour winner), Dick Lotz (three-time PGA tour winner), Bruce Summerhays (three-time PGA tour winner, Bob Wynn, and John McMullin.

Winners 

 2021 Michael Duncan
 2020 Steve Watanabe
 2019 Stuart Smith
 2018 Jeff Brehaut
 2017 Jason Schmuhl
 2016 Jason Schmuhl
 2015 David Solomon
 2014 Jason Schmuhl
 2013 Don Winter
 2012 Mitch Lowe
 2011 Stuart Smith
 2010 Jason Schmuhl
 2009 Mitch Lowe
 2008 Jason Schmuhl
 2007 Tim Huber
 2006 Rick Leibovich
 2005 Steve Hummel
 2004 Rick Leibovich
 2003 Jin Park
 2002 Kris Moe
 2001 Rick Leibovich
 2000 Rich Bin
 1999 Steve Hummel
 1998 Mick Soli
 1997 Steve Hummell
 1996 Bob Borowicz
 1995 Shawn McEntee
 1994 Shawn McEntee
 1993 Jim Kane
 1992 Ed Luethke
 1991 Nate Pomeroy
 1990 Bob Borowicz
 1989 Brad Schneider
 1988 Glen Stubblefield
 1987 Bob Klein
 1986 Bob Lunn
 1985 Dick Lotz
 1984 Larry Babica
 1983 Bob Wynn
 1982 Mike Watney
 1981 George Buzzini, Jr.
 1980 Dick McClean
 1979 Bruce Summerhays
 1978 Bob Boldt
 1977 Steve Taylor
 1976 Steve Taylor
 1975 Ken Towns
 1974 Harold Firstman
 1973 Ken Towns
 1972 Ken Towns
 1971 Ken Towns
 1970 Ken Towns
 1969 Rick Jetter
 1968 Scotty McBeath
 1967 John McMullin
 1966 John McMullin
 1965 Al Mengert
 1964 Tony Lema
 1963 Tony Lema
 1962 Tony Lema
 1961 Bob Moore
 1960 Dick Stranahan
 1959 John Zontek
 1958 Bud Ward
 1956 Bob Moore
 1955 Bud Ward
 1954 George Buzzini, Sr.
 1953 John Geertson
 1952 Pat Markovich
 1951 Sherm Elworthy
 1946–50 No record
 1945 Harold Sampson
 1944 Mark Fry
 1943 Mark Fry
 1942 No record
 1941 Mark Fry
 1940 Ben Coltrin
 1939 Mark Fry
 1938 Mark Fry
 1937 Mark Fry
 1936 Mark Fry
 1935 Mark Fry
 1934 Mark Fry
 1933 Charles Sheppard
 1932 Ben Coltrin
 1931 Harold Sampson
 1930 John Black
 1929 Mark Fry
 1928 Harold Sampson
 1927 Walter Young
 1926 Harold Sampson
 1925 Harold Sampson
 1924 Harold Sampson
 1923 Harold Sampson
 1922 Harold Sampson

References

External links
PGA of America – Northern California section

Golf in California
PGA of America sectional tournaments
Recurring sporting events established in 1922
1922 establishments in California